Anthrenus (Anthrenus) scrophulariae, also known as the common carpet beetle or buffalo carpet beetle, is a species of beetle originally found in Europe, the Middle East and the Nearctic, which has now spread to most of the world. Adult beetles feed on pollen and nectar, but the larvae feed on animal fibres and can be damaging pests to carpets, fabrics and museum specimens.

Description

The antennae have eleven segments, three of which form a club, and the eyes are notched at the front. The head is black but is largely concealed under the prothorax, which is also black, liberally speckled with white scales apart from a band in the centre. The elytra (wing cases) are black with orange or reddish scales near the midline and variable but symmetric patches of white scales elsewhere. As the beetle gets older, the scales tend to get rubbed off so the beetle changes in appearance. The small white eggs are laid in batches of 30 to 60 and have projections which help them to adhere to carpet fibres. The larvae are brown and moult five times before pupating; the final instar larva is hairy and larger than the adult beetle. Pupation takes place in the last larval skin.

Distribution
The common carpet beetle originated in the Palaearctic region, but has been widely introduced elsewhere, now being present in most parts of the world. However, it is more common in temperate parts of the northern hemisphere and less common in the tropics and humid regions.

Life cycle
Adult beetles feed on pollen and nectar, usually selecting white or whitish flowers such as buckwheat, wild aster, daisy, Spiraea and Ceanothus. This diet encourages mating and egg-laying, and the females seek out suitable locations with animal hairs or fibres for ovipositing; these include bird and animal nests, bee hives and the skins of dead animals, as well as indoor sites such as carpets, upholstery, fabrics or preserved animal material. The eggs hatch in two to three weeks, and the larvae chew at whatever animal fibres they find in their environment. After about two months the larvae pupate and the adult insects emerge about a month later and, if indoors, make their way into the open air.

Control

When the eggs are laid on carpets and household fabrics, the larvae feed on the animal fibres and make holes in the materials. Exhibits in museums may be eaten away, leaving a powdering of fine dust round dried insects in collections; herbarium specimens may also be consumed. Human skin that comes into contact with the discarded larval skins may develop dermatitis. Good hygiene and regular vacuuming may prevent infestations from happening. Small items can be placed in airtight containers to keep the beetles out, and both heat and cold treatments are effective against the larvae and eggs. In enclosed spaces, mothballs can be placed as a repellent. Chemical treatments are possible but may not reach all the recesses where the insects lurk, and fumigation may be necessary in extreme cases.

References

External links

scrophulariae
Beetles described in 1758
Taxa named by Carl Linnaeus